Kevin Tame (26 October 1931 – 29 July 1995) is  a former Australian rules footballer who played with Fitzroy in the Victorian Football League (VFL).

Notes

External links 

1931 births
Australian rules footballers from Victoria (Australia)
Fitzroy Football Club players

1995 deaths